Marina Halac (born November 17, 1979) is a professor of economics at Yale University.  She is also an associate editor of Econometrica and a member of the editorial board of the American Economic Review. She was the 2016 recipient of the Elaine Bennett Research Prize, which is awarded biennially by the American Economic Association to recognize outstanding research by a woman. She received this award within the first seven years after completing her PhD in economics from the University of California, Berkeley.  In 2017, she was named one of the "Best 40 under 40 Business School Professors" by Poets and Quants. She was a recipient of the George S. Eccles Research Award in 2017, which is awarded to the author of the best book or writings on economics that bridge theory and practice, as determined by top members of the Columbia Business School faculty and alumni.

Halac was born and raised in Buenos Aires and studied economics at the University of CEMA, Argentina from 1998 to 2001. Here, her professors encouraged her to pursue an advanced economics degree in the United States.  Following her graduation in 2001, she and her husband, Guillermo Noguera, became research assistants at the World Bank in Washington, D.C., and then both earned doctoral degrees in economics at the University of California at Berkeley.

Her research focuses on theoretical models of how to optimally delegate decision making, such as optimal rules for firms that need to delegate investment decisions to managers with competing incentives, problems of how to motivate experimentation and innovation, the design of fiscal rules to constrain government spending, and the role of reputation in maintaining productivity, addressing strategic uncertainty with incentives and information, and inflation targeting under political pressure. Her work on relational contracting, which studies how best to design contracts in a principal-agent setting where the value of the relationship is not mutually known, suggests new ways to approach dynamic contracting problems with bargaining. Additionally, her work regarding fiscal rules and discretion under political shocks examines a specific fiscal policy model where the government has preferences that are time-inconsistent, with a present bias towards public spending. While she is currently employed as an economics professor at Yale University, she has taught at Columbia University, Graduate School of Business, Economics Division as well as University of Warwick. She is a fellow of the Econometric Society.

Selected works

References 

American women economists
21st-century American economists
Argentine economists
Argentine women economists
Game theorists
Microeconomists
Columbia Business School faculty
Yale University faculty
1979 births
Living people
University of California, Berkeley alumni
Fellows of the Econometric Society
21st-century American women